Dennis Dean Higgins (born August 4, 1939) is an American former professional baseball player, a right-handed relief pitcher over all or parts of seven Major League Baseball seasons (1966–1972) with the Chicago White Sox, Washington Senators, Cleveland Indians and St. Louis Cardinals.  He was born in Jefferson City, Missouri, where he graduated from high school.

Career
He appeared in 42 games during his rookie campaign, won his lone decision, was credited with five saves, and posted a solid 2.52 earned run average. He also made the first of what would be two career MLB starts on August 31. Facing the Detroit Tigers at Comiskey Park, he held Detroit off the scoresheet for four full innings, then gave up solo home runs to Gates Brown, Don Wert and Dick McAuliffe in the fifth. He left the game in favor of Juan Pizarro with two out, and the White Sox trailing 3–1. But they battled back to win 7–6 in extra innings.

Higgins' sophomore season was not as successful. He appeared in nine games during April and May , posted an ineffective 5.84 ERA, and was demoted to Triple-A Indianapolis, where he worked in only six games. The following February, he was included in a six-player trade to the Washington Senators. In 1968, he worked in a career-high 59 games and 99 innings pitched, all in relief, win four games, save another 13, and register a 3.25 earned run average. He got into 55 games in 1969, and set personal bests with ten victories and 16 saves for first-year manager Ted Williams. But it was his last year in a Senator uniform: on December 5, he was dealt in another multiplayer transaction, this time to the Cleveland Indians.

During , Higgins' one season in Cleveland, he led the Indians in games pitched (58) and saves (11). But his ERA rose to 3.99, and in  he failed to make the club's MLB roster, and was assigned to Triple-A Wichita. Over five days July, he bounced from the Indians' organization to the Oakland Athletics' system to the St.Louis Cardinals' Triple-A Tulsa affiliate. At the close of the American Association season, the Cardinals recalled him for three September games, then brought him back for 15 appearances bracketing the  season, his final year in Organized Baseball.

For his career, Higgins compiled a 22–23 won–lost record in 241 appearances, with a 3.42 earned run average, 339 strikeouts, and 46 saves. In 410 career innings pitched, he allowed 346 hits and 223 bases on balls.

References

External links

1939 births
Living people
Baseball players from Missouri
Chicago White Sox players
Cleveland Indians players
Dubuque Packers players
Duluth-Superior Dukes players
Idaho Falls Russets players
Indianapolis Indians players
Lincoln Chiefs players
Lynchburg White Sox players
Major League Baseball pitchers
St. Louis Cardinals players
Savannah White Sox players
Sportspeople from Jefferson City, Missouri
Tulsa Oilers (baseball) players
Washington Senators (1961–1971) players
Wichita Aeros players